The Fairfax County Public Library (FCPL) is a public library system comprising 8 regional libraries, 14 community libraries and the Access Services Library Branch, which removes barriers to library services for people with disabilities. FCPL is headquartered in Suite 324 of The Fairfax County Government Center in unincorporated Fairfax County, Virginia, United States.

Hennen's American Public Library Ratings (HAPLR) has ranked the system among the top 10 libraries in the United States (for its size of 500,000+ residents) five times in the past 10 years.

Description
According to the library's timeline, the Fairfax County Library was established in 1939.
, there are 23 library branches—8 regional branches, 14 community branches, and one which assists people with disabilities. The library also oversees the county's Archives and Records Management Branch. The library's service area spans both the county and Fairfax City and several local jurisdictions through reciprocity agreements serving nearly half a million registered users.
The library system is the largest in Virginia in terms of population served (over one million people between Fairfax County and the City of Fairfax).

In the library's 2010 fiscal year (through June 2010), nearly 14 million items were borrowed from its collection of nearly three million books, CDs, DVDs, magazines, and other items. Nearly 5.7 million visits were made to the branches, and website visits reached almost 5 million.

The library offers a wide variety of services both in the branches and via its Web site, including searching through its catalog, reserving items, applying for a library card, viewing calendar of events at libraries, and reserving meeting rooms. The library has public computers for access to the Internet, catalog computers, ebooks, downloadable eaudiobooks, and subscription databases. The library and their Friends groups sponsor various programs, such as children's story times, national and local author readings and book signings, local musical concerts, technology classes and one-on-one sessions, and special events for the county's diverse population.

The number of full-time equivalent (FTE) employees dropped to 379 in FY2014 from 430 at the end of FY2013 in the wake of the library's continuing budget cuts.  Volunteers donated over 124,000 hours in 2014. The Director of the Fairfax County Public Library is Jessica A. Hudson who, in mid-2016, succeeded previous Director Sam (Edwin S.) Clay III, who had served in that position for more than thirty years.

Branches 

 Burke Centre Library (Burke Centre)
 Richard Byrd Library (Springfield)
 Centreville Regional Library (Centreville)
 Chantilly Regional Library (Chantilly)
 City of Fairfax Regional Library (City of Fairfax) — includes the Virginia Room
 Great Falls Library (Great Falls)
 Patrick Henry Library (Vienna)
 Herndon-Fortnightly Library (Herndon)
 Thomas Jefferson Library (West Falls Church)
 Kings Park Library (Kings Park)
 Kingstowne Library (Kingstowne)
 Lorton Library (Lorton)
 Dolley Madison Library (McLean)
 John Marshall Library (Rose Hill)
 George Mason Regional Library (Annandale)
 Oakton Library (Oakton)
 Pohick Regional Library (Burke and West Springfield)
 Reston Regional Library (Reston)
 Sherwood Regional Library (Hybla Valley)
 Tysons-Pimmit Regional Library (Pimmit Hills and Tysons Corner)
 Martha Washington Library (Belle Haven)
 Woodrow Wilson Library (Bailey's Crossroads)

Non-resident privileges
Library cards are available to non-residents without charge who work, go to school in, or owns property in Fairfax County, or who live, work, own property or go to school in the City of Fairfax, or the Towns of Herndon or Vienna. A card is also available free for a person who lives, works or owns property in a jurisdiction that provides reciprocal privileges. Thus, cards are available for free for residents, property owners and employees working in the District of Columbia; the Maryland Counties of Frederick, Montgomery, and Prince George's; the Virginia Cities of Alexandria, Falls Church, Manassas and Manassas Park; and the Virginia counties of Arlington, Fauquier, Loudoun, and Prince William. All others who do not qualify may obtain a card for $27 a year.

Nearby public library systems
 Alexandria Public Library
 Arlington Public Library
 District of Columbia Public Library
 Loudoun County Public Library
 Montgomery County Public Libraries
 Prince George's County Memorial Library System

References 

Fairfax
Education in Fairfax County, Virginia
1939 establishments in Virginia
Public libraries in Virginia
Libraries established in 1939